Konstantinos Markopoulos (born 8 February 1992) is a Greek professional footballer who plays as a striker for German club 1. CfR Pforzheim.

Honours
Kavala
Gamma Ethniki: 2018–19

References

1992 births
Footballers from Drama, Greece
Living people
Greek footballers
Association football forwards
Royale Union Saint-Gilloise players
Panthrakikos F.C. players
Doxa Drama F.C. players
Kavala F.C. players
SGV Freiberg players
Super League Greece players
Football League (Greece) players
Gamma Ethniki players
Oberliga (football) players
Greek expatriate footballers
Expatriate footballers in Belgium
Greek expatriate sportspeople in Belgium
Expatriate footballers in Germany
Greek expatriate sportspeople in Germany